The priestly robe ( me'il), sometimes robe of the ephod ( meil ha-ephod), is one of the sacred articles of clothing (bigdei kehunah) of the Jewish High Priest. It was worn under the Ephod. Like all the priestly garments, it was to be made by 'gifted artisans ... filled with the spirit of wisdom'.

Hebrew Bible
The Hebrew noun meil occurs 30 times in the Masoretic Text of the Hebrew Bible, and refers not only to the robe of the high priest but also any robe worn over a tunic by men of rank, such as the robe Jonathan gave to David, or his mantle which Job tore in desperation, and also the outer cloak of women - such as the robe worn by David's daughters.

It was a sleeveless, purple-blue or violet  (techelet) robe (me'il), woven in a single piece. The opening in the center for the High Priest's head to pass through was woven, not cut or torn. The lower hem of the garment was fringed with small golden bells alternating with pomegranate-shaped tassels of blue (turquoise), purple and scarlet wool.

The golden bells were a necessity, and they must ring when the High Priest entered the Holy of Holies on the Day of Atonement, lest he die.

Rabbinical commentary
Rashi deduced a law for all the priestly vestments: “From the negative one can derive the positive: if he will have them he will not be liable for death; thus, if he enters lacking one of these garments he is liable for death at the hands of Heaven.” Maimonides rules likewise.

According to the Talmud, the wearing of the priestly robe atoned for the sin of evil speech on the part of the Children of Israel (B.Zevachim 88b).

In traditional Rabbinical teaching, each of the priestly robes is intended to atone for a particular sin on the part of the Children of Israel. The eminent sage Rashi points out in his commentary on the Talmud that the robe was fashioned to atone for the sin of an evil tongue, speaking poorly about someone else. As the High Priest, adorned with the priestly garments, walked, the bells noisily announced his presence, and because the noise emanated from the robe, it served as a reminder for people to refrain from gossip. The Talmud also states that the tassels between each bell on the robe were made of three materials: turquoise, purple, and scarlet wool. These three materials signify to the three people who are injured when lashon hara is spoken: the speaker, the listener, and the one who is spoken about.

See also
 Priestly undergarments
 Priestly tunic
 Priestly sash
 Priestly turban
 Ephod
 Priestly breastplate
 Priestly frontlet
 Tetzaveh parsha, 20th liturgical reading
 Kittel, white robe and burial shroud

References

External links
 Shabbat Parshat Tetzaveh description of the Me'il and its spiritual significance
 Me'il Techelet Robe of the Ephod being constructed by The Temple Institute in Jerusalem

Jewish religious clothing
Robe